Argyra flavipes is a species of long-legged fly in the family Dolichopodidae.

References

Diaphorinae
Articles created by Qbugbot
Insects described in 1925
Diptera of North America